Time of Happiness is a 1997 Spanish film directed and written by . Its cast features Verónica Forqué, Silvia Abascal, María Adánez, Carlos Fuentes, Pepón Nieto, Liberto Rabal, Fele Martínez, and Antonio Resines, among others.

Plot 
The fiction is set in Ibiza in the Summer of 1970, with the backdrop of the hippy counterculture and the topic of free love. It tracks a "disfunctional" nuclear family (consisting of Julia and Fernando as well as their four children Cucho, Elena, Verónica and Juan) and their romantic and sexual endeavours in the island.

Cast

Production 
The film is a Sogecine and Central de Producciones Audiovisuales production. While set in Ibiza, the film was primarily shot in the neighbouring island of Mallorca.

Release 
Distributed by Sogepaq, the film was theatrically released in Spain on 4 July 1997.

Reception 
Jonathan Holland of Variety considered that Iborra delivers a "mature but slightly flat nostalgia vehicle" that despite being "well crafted and intermittently affecting" and with some "terrific" performances, it is unlikely to induce "anything but mild astonishment" among offshore audiences.

Casimiro Torreiro of El País considered that, excessive subordination of the film to Forqué as well as other issues notwithstanding, the film breathes at ease when its young actresses (particularly Abascal) take over.

Accolades 

|-
| align = "center" | 1998 || 12th Goya Awards || Best Sound || Daniel Goldstein, Eduardo Fernández, Ricardo Steinberg ||  || align = "center" | 
|}

See also 
 List of Spanish films of 1997

References 

Sogecine films
1997 comedy films
1990s Spanish-language films
Films set in Ibiza
Films shot in Mallorca
Films set in 1970
1990s Spanish films